This is a complete list of numbers retired by the National Hockey League (NHL). A retired number is a jersey number that is taken out of circulation by a team as a way of honouring a former member of that team who wore that number; after the number's retirement, members of that team are not permitted to wear the number on their jerseys unless by permission of the original number holder.

The first team to retire a number was the Toronto Maple Leafs, which retired Ace Bailey's number 6 on February 14, 1934, prior to an All-Star game organized in his honour.

The NHL currently has 179 retired numbers, 10 former retirements and 24 honoured numbers. Most of the numbers retired by the Hartford Whalers and Quebec Nordiques were put back in circulation when those franchises relocated and became the Carolina Hurricanes and Colorado Avalanche, respectively, although the Hurricanes keep Gordie Howe's number 9 unofficially retired. The Minnesota North Stars' two retired numbers were carried over when that franchise relocated to become the Dallas Stars, and remain retired today.  The Arizona Coyotes had a policy of retaining the numbers retired when the franchise was the Winnipeg Jets but reversed it after the Phoenix Coyotes were sold and became the Arizona Coyotes; these were retroactively classified as honoured numbers as part of the Arizona Coyotes Ring of Honor. Honoured numbers are similar to retired numbers, except that they remain available for use by other players. Presently, only the Calgary Flames, the St. Louis Blues, the Arizona Coyotes and the Winnipeg Jets (the latter honouring the players of the original Jets) employ this designation.
  
Wayne Gretzky's number 99 was retired league-wide in 2000; Gretzky's former teams the Edmonton Oilers and Los Angeles Kings also separately retired his number.

, only the Winnipeg Jets have no retired numbers. Five teams have retired six numbers that are not those of former players from their franchises: the Ottawa Senators, Florida Panthers (x2), Minnesota Wild, Seattle Kraken, and Vegas Golden Knights.

Twelve numbers have been retired by a team in honour of two different players.

Nine players have had their number retired by two different NHL teams:
Bobby Hull – Chicago Blackhawks and the original Winnipeg Jets
Gordie Howe – Detroit Red Wings and Hartford Whalers
Wayne Gretzky – Edmonton Oilers and Los Angeles Kings (also retired league-wide)
Ray Bourque – Boston Bruins and Colorado Avalanche
Mark Messier – Edmonton Oilers and New York Rangers 
Patrick Roy – Colorado Avalanche and Montreal Canadiens
Tim Horton – Buffalo Sabres and Toronto Maple Leafs
Red Kelly – Detroit Red Wings and Toronto Maple Leafs
Scott Niedermayer – Anaheim Ducks and New Jersey Devils

Retired numbers
Key

Italics denote numbers that will be retired during the 2022–23 NHL season.

Unofficially retired numbers

These numbers are not considered officially retired, but have still been removed from circulation.
Key

Honoured numbers
Unlike the numbers retired by the Flames, these honoured numbers were not necessarily withdrawn from circulation.  Some of the numbers honoured by the Blues remain in circulation, while others have been removed from circulation without being officially retired.

A few uniform numbers of the original Winnipeg Jets were honoured by both the current Jets (originally the Atlanta Thrashers) and the Arizona Coyotes, the relocated incarnation of the original Jets. These numbers remain in circulation by both teams.
Key

Former retired numbers
It is very rare for a team to reissue a retired number, and usually requires a special circumstance, such as a number being requested for a family member (such as Bobby Hull asking the Phoenix Coyotes to allow his son Brett to wear Bobby's number 9), or the player for whom the number was retired coming out of retirement himself (such as Mario Lemieux).

In cases of franchise relocation, the handling of existing retired numbers is at the discretion of team management. They may decide to continue honouring the retired numbers, such as the Dallas Stars and Phoenix/Arizona Coyotes, or they may choose to make a "fresh start" and reissue the numbers, as the Colorado Avalanche and Carolina Hurricanes have done.

The Hurricanes have an unusual exception with regards to Gordie Howe's number 9. While the Hurricanes have not made any formal recognition of the Hartford Whalers' retirement of the number, they have kept the number out of circulation since their 1997 relocation.

The Red Wings and Larry Aurie's number 6 are also something of a unique situation, as the number was officially retired, then un-retired so that his cousin, Cummy Burton, could wear it, much as the Jets/Coyotes did for the Hulls. It was then re-retired until 2000, when the Red Wings ordered it removed from the NHL's Official Guide and Record Book. Despite the unretirement, number 6 is still not available to be worn in Detroit.
Key

References

External links

Retired numbers
 
NHL